The 2005 Ball State Cardinals football team represented  Ball State University during the 2005 NCAA Division I-A football season. Ball State competed as a member of the West Division of the Mid-American Conference (MAC). The Cardinals were led by Brady Hoke in his third year as head coach.

Schedule

References

Ball State
Ball State Cardinals football seasons
Ball State Cardinals football